The Norway women's national ice hockey team is the women's national ice hockey team in Norway. The team represents Norway at the International Ice Hockey Federation (IIHF)'sWorld Women's Championships and is controlled by Norges Ishockeyforbund. Women's ice hockey is growing in popularity in Norway and the number of Norwegian women's ice hockey players registered with the IIHF has increased from 482 in 2011 to 702 in 2019.

Tournament record

Olympic Games
Norway has never participated in the Women's hockey Olympic tournament.

World Championship
Norway participated in every World Women's Championship, realizing its best performance during the first three tournaments by garnering a sixth-place finish. In 1999, it failed to qualify for Group A, and has since competed in the lower levels. From 2001 until 2005, the Norway players competed in series to be relegated or promoted between the first and second division. Since 2007, they have competed in Division I. Of note, the National Under-18 team competes in Division I for its respective category.

European Women Championship
1989 – 4th
1991 – 4th
1993 –  3rd
1995 – 4th
1996 – 4th

Team

2022 roster
Roster for the 2022 IIHF Women's World Championship Division I Group A. Player age at start of tournament on 24 April 2022.

Head coach: Thomas PettersenAssistant coach: Claes Halvordsson

Awards and honors
Ena Nystrøm, Directorate Award, Best Goaltender, 2019 IIHF Women's World Championship Division I

References

External links

IIHF profile
National Teams of Ice Hockey

Ice hockey
Ice hockey in Norway
Women's national ice hockey teams in Europe
1988 establishments in Norway